Risshton Ki Dor is a Hindi language soap opera that premiered on Sony TV channel based on the concept of human spirit and its emotions. The series premiered on 15 May 2006, and aired every Monday to Thursday at 1:30pm (UTC) and ended on 29 March 2007. The series was produced by Adhikari Brothers Limited and executive producer Tanveer Alam.

Plot
The story is about a brother Suhas who struggles to keep his family united after the 'supposed' death of their parents. He promises his parents to take care of his 3 younger sisters.

Tejaswini, the middle sister and the protagonist, is a young nurse who is studying medicine and falls in love with Rahul Raichand, a successful engineer. Circumstances lead to Tejaswini being forced to choose between her love for Rahul and the devotion she feels towards her brother Suhas.

Cast
 Anuj Saxena as Suhas Abhayankar 
 Urvashi Dholakia as Niyonika, Suhas' Wife
 Moonmoon Banerjee as ACP Neha
 Sampada Vaze as Tejaswini Abhayankar
 Shital Thakkar as Shubhangi Abhayankar 
 Monaz Mevawala as Mansi Abhayankar 
 Toral Rasputra as Shaina
 Gaurav Chanana / Amit Sarin as Rahul Raichand
 Jiten Lalwani as Kunal Shah
 Muskaan Mihani as Tara
 Ajaykumar Arya as Ronnie 
 Ekta Sharma 
 Raza Murad
 Anju Mahendru
 Aditi Ghorpade
 Yatin Karyekar as Sharad Abhayankar / Dr. Milind Kelkar
 Rishabh Shukla
 Rushad Rana
 Utkarsha Naik
 Shabnam Sayed
 Shrivallabh Vyas

References

External links
Official Site on SET Asia
Risshton Ki Dor News Article

Indian television soap operas
Sony Entertainment Television original programming
2006 Indian television series debuts
2007 Indian television series endings